Peter A. Salmon (August 3, 1929 – October 11, 2003) was a competitive backstroke, breaststroke and freestyle swimmer from Canada.  He represented Canada at two consecutive Summer Olympics, starting in 1948 in London.  Salmon claimed the gold medal in the men's 100-metre freestyle event at the 1950 British Empire Games in Auckland, New Zealand.

See also
List of Commonwealth Games medallists in swimming (men)

References
Peter Salmon's profile at Sports Reference.com
Peter Salmon's obituary

External links

1929 births
2003 deaths
Canadian male backstroke swimmers
Canadian male breaststroke swimmers
Canadian male freestyle swimmers
Swimmers from Victoria, British Columbia
Commonwealth Games gold medallists for Canada
Commonwealth Games silver medallists for Canada
Swimmers at the 1950 British Empire Games
Olympic swimmers of Canada
Swimmers at the 1948 Summer Olympics
Swimmers at the 1952 Summer Olympics
Commonwealth Games medallists in swimming
Medallists at the 1950 British Empire Games